La Chapelle-aux-Lys is a former commune in the Vendée department in the Pays de la Loire region in western France. On 1 January 2023, it was merged into the new commune of Terval.

See also
Communes of the Vendée department

References

Former communes of Vendée